Grecian was a steel bulk freighter built in 1891 by Globe Iron Works at Cleveland, Ohio.

History
Grecian was built to carry iron ore for the Chapin Iron Mining Company, and ran between the company's docks in Escanaba, Michigan and Cleveland, Ohio. In 1896 made 35 trips through the Great Lakes, carrying 93,000 tons of iron ore. On June 7, 1906 the unladen Grecian struck a rock and sank in shallow water near De Tour Village in the St. Mary's River. The ship was refloated, and taken in tow by the steamer Sir Henry Bessemer, with the plan to take it to Detroit, Michigan for repairs. However, on June 15, it unexpectedly sank near Thunder Bay Island.  The crew escaped in lifeboats. Salvage was attempted 1909 by the Staud Canalon Salvage Company, but to no avail.

The wreck
It features an intact bow and stern lie intact, with a collapsed midships portion. The engine, boiler, sections of the propeller, and the deck machinery all remain in place and are visible. There is also a steel canalon (a salvage lifting device) from the 1909 salvage attempt lies off the ship's stern. Most of movable artifacts once aboard the ship have been taken by salvagers and recreational divers.

References

 

1891 ships
Ships built in Cleveland
Great Lakes freighters
Maritime incidents in 1906
Shipwrecks of Lake Huron
Shipwrecks on the National Register of Historic Places in Michigan
Wreck diving sites in the United States